Diligentia is a learned society founded in The Hague in 1793. All reigning monarchs of The Netherlands since King William I have been patrons of Diligentia, and many members of the Royal Family have been honorary members.

References

External links 
 Official website 

Learned societies of the Netherlands
Organizations established in 1793